Peden may refer to:

People

First name
 Peden McLeod (1940-2021), American lawyer and politician

Middle name
 Pearl Peden Oldfield (1876–1962), American politician

Surname

 Alexander Peden (1626–1686), Scottish religious figure
 Bill Peden, Australian rugby league footballer
 Bob Peden (1906–1985), Scottish footballer
 Chris Peden, American politician
 Don Peden (c. 1898–1970), American football and baseball player and coach
 Doug Peden (1916–2005), Canadian basketball player
 Forrest E. Peden (1913–1945), American soldier and Medal of Honor recipient
 G. C. Peden, British historian
 George Peden (footballer) (born 1943), Scottish footballer
 Irene C. Peden, American engineer
 Jack Peden (1865–?), Irish footballer
 John Peden, American football coach
 Les Peden (1923–2002), American baseball player and manager
 Margaret Peden (1905–1981), Australian cricketer
 Margaret Sayers Peden (1927–2020), American translator and professor
 Mike Peden, British producer, remixer, and composer
 Murray Peden, (1923–2022), Canadian Air Force pilot, lawyer and author
 Murray Peden, (1946–1978), Scottish cricketer
 Preston E. Peden (1914–1985), American politician
 Robbie Peden (born 1973), Australian boxer

Places
 Peden Cliffs, a line of cliffs in Antarctica
 Peden Stadium, a football stadium on the campus of Ohio University
 Peden's Stone, a monument in Harthill, Scotland named for Alexander Peden